Botrychium minganense is a species of fern in the family Ophioglossaceae known by the common name Mingan moonwort. It is native to North America from Alaska and northern Canada to Arizona, where it is uncommon throughout most of its range, appearing at scattered spots in coniferous forests and marshy areas such as swamps. This is very small plant growing from an underground caudex and sending one thin leaf above the surface of the ground. The leaf is up to 10 centimeters tall and is divided into a sterile and a fertile part. The sterile part of the leaf has fan-shaped or spoon-shaped leaflets. The fertile part of the leaf is very different in shape, with grapelike clusters of sporangia by which it reproduces.

References

External links

Jepson Manual Treatment
USDA Plants Profile
Flora of North America
Photo gallery

minganense
Plants described in 1927